Mohammad Rahmati (born 28 December 1994) is an Iranian professional football player who currently plays for Iranian club Sorkhpooshan Pakdasht as a midfielder.

Career

Persepolis
He joined Persepolis in the summer 2010 as a youth player. He played 5 seasons for Persepolis Academy. He captained Persepolis U-21 Academy team. He signed with Persepolis  in 22 June 2015 with two years contracts.

Club Career Statistics

References

External links 

1994 births
Living people
Iranian footballers
Persepolis F.C. players
Saba players
Association football forwards
Sportspeople from Mazandaran province
People from Tonekabon